Lucie Finez, born 25 November 1976 in Bouake, Ivory Coast, is a former French athlete who practiced the high jump and who competed for l'Evreux Athlétic Club.

Prize list  
 Records
1.90 m(personal best)
 Performances
  in Championnats de France d'athlétisme 2001 Outdoors   
  in Championnats de France d'athlétisme en salle 2004 Indoors   
 Participation in the Seville World Athletic Championships in 1999 where she placed 12th with a jump of 1.85m.

External links  
 
 Biography

1976 births
Living people
French female high jumpers
World Athletics Championships athletes for France
People from Bouaké
21st-century French women